M26 is a Ukrainian international highway (M-highway) in western Ukraine that runs within Berehove Raion from the M23 at Vylok near the Hungarian border to the Romanian border where it continues as the DN1C into Romania. The M26 is part of European routes E81 and E58. Before 2013 the route was designated as P55.

Main route
Main route and connections to/intersections with other highways in Ukraine.

See also

 Roads in Ukraine
 Ukraine Highways
 International E-road network
 Pan-European corridors

References

External links
 European Roads in Russian

Roads in Zakarpattia Oblast